Heart Valley is a 2022 short documentary film about Welsh shepherd Wilf Davies. Directed and produced by filmmaker Christian Cargill, the film had its world premiere at the Tribeca Film Festival on June 9, 2022 where it won the award for Best Documentary Short. It first broadcast in the UK on BBC Two Wales and BBC iPlayer on July 26, 2022 and released online with The New Yorker on December 2, 2022. The Hollywood Reporter named Heart Valley as one of their Top 23 Short Documentaries of 2022 and it was one of 98 films to qualify for the 95th Academy Awards for Best Documentary Short.

Synopsis 
Heart Valley follows a day in the life of Evan Wilf Davies, a shepherd from Ceredigion in West Wales. The film looks at the world through Wilf's eyes, asking questions about what it is we should value as a society. The documentary was composed by Scottish multi-instrumentalist Erland Cooper and was originally inspired by an article written by Kiran Sidhu in The Guardian newspaper.

Reception 
The film won multiple awards including Best Documentary Short at the 2022 Tribeca Film Festival. The jury, which included Amy Ryan, Shane Smith and A.J. Jacobs, described, "This quiet short sneaks in profound lessons about the importance of simplicity, doing the work we love, and what the meaning of life is." It has received a variety of positive press, featuring on BBC World's Talking Movies with Tom Brook, The Guardian, BBC News, BBC Radio Wales and S4C's Prynhawn Da programme. The author David Nicholls described the film as "an absolute gem of a documentary; sensitively made, touching and tender."

Festivals & Awards

References

External links 
 
 Heart Valley at Tribeca Film Festival

British short documentary films
2022 films
2022 short documentary films